Ten hill stations have been built in Malaysia's mountainous areas. Four are in the state of Pahang, two are in Perak, and one each are in Kedah, Negeri Sembilan, Penang, and Selangor.

The concept of a hill station in the Malay Peninsula began during the colonial period of British Malaya. The British were not used to the environment, especially the hot tropical weather, endemic illnesses, and mosquito breeding areas. As a result, they began looking for alternative ways to allow British people to stay in tropical countries for a longer durations, as the travel distance and the British government's leave policy prevented any people who had settled in tropical countries from returning to Britain on a regular basis. Due to Malaya's geographical factors and abundant natural beauty, the British government built hill stations in the country. The first hill station, Penang Hill, was founded in 1787 on Penang Island. It was soon followed by Bukit Larut (1884) and Mount Kledang (1892) in Perak, Treacher Hill (1893) in Selangor, Fraser's Hill (1919) and Cameron Highlands (1925) in Pahang, and Mount Angsi (year unknown) in Negeri Sembilan. Plans were initially made to build another hill station, on Mount Tahan, but it was never built due to the northern part of Mount Tahan being in Kelantan and not under British control.

Following the independence of the Federation of Malaya in 1957 and the formation of Malaysia in 1963, another three hill stations were built: Genting Highlands (1971) in Pahang, Mount Jerai (1986) in Kedah, and Bukit Tinggi (1994) in Pahang. Unlike the previous colonial hill stations, they were established by the local people rather than by the British. Genting Highlands was inspired by founder Lim Goh Tong's business trip in the Cameron Highlands, where the fresh and cold climate of the hill station inspired him to build an entertainment center atop the hill. It includes hotels, amusement parks, cable cars, a golf course, the only operating casino in Malaysia, and the upcoming Genting SkyWorlds, which contains attractions with licensing agreements from 20th Century Studios and the Walt Disney Company. However, recent development at hill stations, including the renovation and uplifting of those built by the colonial government, have brought concerns over potential environmental consequences, including deforestation, water pollution, and visual pollution.

List
According to Samuel Robert Aiken, professor of geography at Concordia University, the hill stations built before Malayan independence in 1957 can be divided into two categories: principal hill stations and minor hill stations. Principal hill stations are those that were developed in locations that were more integrated with social and cultural interactions, whereas minor hill stations are those that were less developed due to limited growth and low elevation, where the hill station was not located high enough to satisfy needs for a place with a sufficiently cool climate, and a lack of flat land to accommodate more government officials. Other hill stations that were not categorized by Aiken include Genting Highlands, Mount Jerai and Bukit Tinggi.  These hill stations were developed after the independence, but received significant coverage from organizations including the University of California, Berkeley, the New Straits Times, and the World Wide Fund for Nature for strong economic and tourism development, or for potential risks to the environment due to recent development.

Notes

References

Bibliography

 
 
 

Hill stations